Diethyl ether, or simply ether, is an organic compound in the ether class with the formula  or , sometimes abbreviated as , where Et stands for monovalent ethyl group  which is often written as  (see Pseudoelement symbols). It is a colourless, highly volatile, sweet-smelling ("ethereal odour"), extremely flammable liquid. It is commonly used as a solvent in laboratories and as a starting fluid for some engines. It was formerly used as a general anesthetic, until non-flammable drugs were developed, such as halothane. It has been used as a recreational drug to cause intoxication.

Production 
Most diethyl ether is produced as a byproduct of the vapor-phase hydration of ethylene to make ethanol. This process uses solid-supported phosphoric acid catalysts and can be adjusted to make more ether if the need arises. Vapor-phase dehydration of ethanol over some alumina catalysts can give diethyl ether yields of up to 95%.

Diethyl ether can be prepared both in laboratories and on an industrial scale by the acid ether synthesis. Ethanol is mixed with a strong acid, typically sulfuric acid, H2SO4. The acid dissociates in the aqueous environment producing hydronium ions, H3O+. A hydrogen ion protonates the electronegative oxygen atom of the ethanol, giving the ethanol molecule a positive charge:

A nucleophilic oxygen atom of unprotonated ethanol displaces a water molecule from the protonated (electrophilic) ethanol molecule, reforming the hydronium ion and yielding diethyl ether.

 

This reaction must be carried out at temperatures lower than 150 °C in order to ensure that an elimination product (ethylene) is not a product of the reaction. At higher temperatures, ethanol will dehydrate to form ethylene. The reaction to make diethyl ether is reversible, so eventually an equilibrium between reactants and products is achieved. Getting a good yield of ether requires that ether be distilled out of the reaction mixture before it reverts to ethanol, taking advantage of Le Chatelier's principle.

Another reaction that can be used for the preparation of ethers is the Williamson ether synthesis, in which an alkoxide (produced by dissolving an alkali metal in the alcohol to be used) performs a nucleophilic substitution upon an alkyl halide.

Uses 
It is particularly important as a solvent in the production of cellulose plastics such as cellulose acetate.

Fuel 
Diethyl ether has a high cetane number of 85–96 and is used as a starting fluid, in combination with petroleum distillates for gasoline and diesel engines because of its high volatility and low flash point. Ether starting fluid is sold and used in countries with cold climates, as it can help with cold starting an engine at sub-zero temperatures. For the same reason it is also used as a component of the fuel mixture for carbureted compression ignition model engines. In this way diethyl ether is very similar to one of its precursors, ethanol.

Chemistry 
Diethyl ether is a hard Lewis base that reacts with a variety of Lewis acids such as iodine, phenol, and trimethylaluminium, and its base parameters in the ECW model are EB = 1.80 and CB = 1.63. Diethyl ether is a common laboratory aprotic solvent. It has limited solubility in water (6.05 g/100 ml at 25 °C) and dissolves 1.5 g/100 g (1.0 g/100 ml) water at 25 °C. This, coupled with its high volatility, makes it ideal for use as the non-polar solvent in liquid-liquid extraction. When used with an aqueous solution, the diethyl ether layer is on top as it has a lower density than the water. It is also a common solvent for the Grignard reaction in addition to other reactions involving organometallic reagents. Due to its application in the manufacturing of illicit substances, it is listed in the Table II precursor under the United Nations Convention Against Illicit Traffic in Narcotic Drugs and Psychotropic Substances as well as substances such as acetone, toluene and sulfuric acid.

Anesthesia 

William T. G. Morton participated in a public demonstration of ether anesthesia on October 16, 1846, at the Ether Dome in Boston, Massachusetts. However, Crawford Williamson Long is now known to have demonstrated its use privately as a general anesthetic in surgery to officials in Georgia, as early as March 30, 1842, and Long publicly demonstrated ether's use as a surgical anesthetic on six occasions before the Boston demonstration. British doctors were aware of the anesthetic properties of ether as early as 1840 where it was widely prescribed in conjunction with opium. Diethyl ether largely supplanted the use of chloroform as a general anesthetic due to ether's more favorable therapeutic index, that is, a greater difference between an effective dose and a potentially toxic dose.

Diethyl ether does not depress the myocardium but rather it stimulates the sympathetic nervous system leading to hypertension and tachycardia. It is safely used in patients with shock as it preserves the baroreceptor reflex. Its minimal effect on myocardial depression and respiratory drive, as well as its low cost and high therapeutic index allows it to see continued use in developing countries. Diethyl ether could also be mixed with other anesthetic agents such as chloroform to make C.E. mixture, or chloroform and alcohol to make A.C.E. mixture. In the 21st century, ether is rarely used. The use of flammable ether was displaced by nonflammable fluorinated hydrocarbon anesthetics. Halothane was the first such anesthetic developed and other currently used inhaled anesthetics, such as isoflurane, desflurane, and sevoflurane, are halogenated ethers. Diethyl ether was found to have undesirable side effects, such as post-anesthetic nausea and vomiting. Modern anesthetic agents reduce these side effects.

Prior to 2005 it was on the World Health Organization's List of Essential Medicines for use as an anesthetic.

Medicine 
Ether was once used in pharmaceutical formulations. A mixture of alcohol and ether, one part of diethyl ether and three parts of ethanol, was known as "Spirit of ether", Hoffman's Anodyne or Hoffman's Drops. In the United States this concoction was removed from the Pharmacopeia at some point prior to June 1917, as a study published by William Procter, Jr. in the American Journal of Pharmacy as early as 1852 showed that there were differences in formulation to be found between commercial manufacturers, between international pharmacopoeia, and from Hoffman's original recipe. It is also used to treat hiccups through instillation into nasal cavity.

Recreation 

The anesthetic and intoxicating effects of ether have made it a recreational drug. Diethyl ether in anesthetic dosage is an inhalant which has a long history of recreational use. One disadvantage is the high flammability, especially in conjunction with oxygen. One advantage is a well-defined margin between therapeutic and toxic doses, which means one would lose consciousness before dangerous levels of dissolved ether in blood would be reached. With a strong, dense smell, ether causes irritation to respiratory mucosa and is uncomfortable to breathe, and in overdose triggering salivation, vomiting, coughing or spasms. In concentrations of 3–5% in air, an anesthetic effect can slowly be achieved in 15–20 minutes of breathing approximately 15–20 ml of ether, depending on body weight and physical condition. Ether causes a very long excitation stage prior to blacking out.

The recreational use of ether also took place at organised parties in the 19th century called ether frolics, where guests were encouraged to inhale therapeutic amounts of diethyl ether or nitrous oxide, producing a state of excitation. Long, as well as fellow dentists Horace Wells, William Edward Clarke and William T. G. Morton observed that during these gatherings, people would often experience minor injuries but appear to show no reaction to the injury, nor memory that it had happened, demonstrating ether's anaesthetic effects.

In the 19th century and early 20th century ether drinking was popular among Polish peasants. It is a traditional and still relatively popular recreational drug among Lemkos. It is usually consumed in a small quantity (kropka, or "dot") poured over milk, sugar water, or orange juice in a shot glass. As a drug, it has been known to cause psychological dependence, sometimes referred to as etheromania.

Metabolism 
A cytochrome P450 enzyme is proposed to metabolize diethyl ether.

Diethyl ether inhibits alcohol dehydrogenase, and thus slows the metabolism of ethanol. It also inhibits metabolism of other drugs requiring oxidative metabolism.
For example, diazepam requires hepatic oxidization whereas its oxidized metabolite oxazepam does not.

Safety and stability 
Diethyl ether is extremely flammable and may form explosive vapour/air mixtures.

Since ether is heavier than air it can collect low to the ground and the vapour may travel considerable distances to ignition sources. Ether will ignite if exposed to an open flame, though due its high flammability, an open flame is not required for ignition. Other possible ignition sources include - but are not limited to - hot plates, steam pipes, heaters, and electrical arcs created by switches or outlets. Vapour may also be ignited by the static electricity which can build up when ether is being poured from one vessel into another.

Ether is sensitive to light and air, tending to form explosive peroxides. Ether peroxides have a higher boiling point than ether and are contact explosives when dry. Commercial diethyl ether is typically supplied with trace amounts of the antioxidant butylated hydroxytoluene (BHT), which reduces the formation of peroxides. Storage over sodium hydroxide precipitates the intermediate ether hydroperoxides. Water and peroxides can be removed by either distillation from sodium and benzophenone, or by passing through a column of activated alumina.

History 
The compound may have been synthesised by either Jābir ibn Hayyān in the 8th century or Ramon Llull in 1275. It was synthesised in 1540 by Valerius Cordus, who called it "sweet oil of vitriol" (oleum dulce vitrioli)—the name reflects the fact that it is obtained by distilling a mixture of ethanol and sulfuric acid (then known as oil of vitriol)—and noted some of its medicinal properties. At about the same time, Paracelsus discovered the analgesic properties of the molecule in dogs. The name ether was given to the substance in 1729 by August Sigmund Frobenius.

It was considered to be a sulfur compound until the idea was disproved in about 1800.

References

External links 

 Michael Faraday's announcement of ether as an anesthetic in 1818 
 Calculation of vapor pressure, liquid density, dynamic liquid viscosity, surface tension of diethyl ether, ddbonline.ddbst.de
 CDC – NIOSH Pocket Guide to Chemical Hazards

Dialkyl ethers
General anesthetics
Dissociative drugs
Euphoriants
Fuels
Ether solvents
GABAA receptor positive allosteric modulators
NMDA receptor antagonists
Glycine receptor agonists
Symmetrical ethers
Sweet-smelling chemicals